The River Torrens , (Karrawirra Parri / Karrawirraparri) is the most significant river of the Adelaide Plains. It was one of the main reasons for the siting of the city of Adelaide, capital of South Australia. It flows  from its source in the Adelaide Hills near Mount Pleasant, across the Adelaide Plains, past the city centre and empties into Gulf St Vincent between Henley Beach South and West Beach. The upper stretches of the river and the reservoirs in its watershed supply a significant part of the city's water supply.

The river is also known by the native Kaurna name for the river—Karrawirra Parri or Karrawirraparri (karra meaning redgum, wirra meaning forest and parri meaning river), having been officially dual-named in 2001. Another Kaurna name for the river was Tarndaparri (Kangaroo river). The river was thought to be a reflection of the Milky Way ("wodliparri"), and was the heartland of the Kaurna people, who lived along its length and around the tributary creeks.

At its 1836 exploration by William Light, an inland bend was chosen as the site of the Adelaide city centre and North Adelaide. The river was first named the Yatala by the initial exploration party, but later renamed to honour Robert Torrens senior, chairman of the board of Colonisation Commissioners for South Australia from 1834 to 1841 (when he was sacked).
From March 1837 settlers camped in tents and makeshift huts along the west end of the River Torrens and freely used the river's resources. A Native Location was created on the north banks of the Torrens and indigenous labour was often used by the settlers for tasks such as hewing wood or delivering water. During the early years of settlement, the river acted as both the city's primary water source and main sewer, leading to outbreaks of typhoid.

Since European settlement the river has been a frequently touted tourist attraction. The river's long linear parks and a constructed lake in the lower stretch are iconic of the city. The river's flora and fauna have been both deliberately and accidentally impacted since settlement. In the 19th century, native forests were cleared, gravel removed for construction and many foreign species introduced. With construction of the linear parks, many species native to the river have been replanted, and introduced species have been controlled as weeds.

They range from sometimes raging torrents, damaging bridges and flooding city areas, to trickles and completely dry in summer. Winter and spring flooding has prompted the construction of flood reduction works. A constructed sea outlet, landscaped linear parks and three holding reservoirs contain peak flow.

Physiography
The River Torrens runs largely westward from the Adelaide Hills, through the centre of Adelaide to the Gulf St Vincent. It runs predominantly along faulted north-south ground structures, which were formed over 250 million years ago during the Paleozoic era then further dislocated during the Cretaceous and earliest Tertiary. There is a  subsidence along the Para Fault which also affects the rivers flow. This subsidence was formed in the last two million years, after the Pliocene era.

From its origin to Birdwood the river follows rolling, relatively level country before entering a hilly section that continues to Gumeracha. The river then follows sedimentary rock strata before entering a gorge after Cudlee Creek. It flows through the gorge to Athelstone, passing over the Eden Fault Zone of the Adelaide Hills face and associated escarpment. After the scarp it flows over sedimentary rocks of varying resistance to erosion, which has led to interspersed narrows and broad basins. From the base of the Adelaide Hills to Adelaide's central business district it runs in a shallow valley with a terraced floor, then down the slope of its own alluvial fan. The structure of this fan shows that the river formerly entered Gulf St Vincent via the Port River. Over time the Torrens deposited sediment, choking its own outflow; becoming locked behind coastal sand dunes and forming the swampy areas of the Cowandilla Plains and The Reedbeds.

Tributaries
The Torrens is fed by numerous seasonal creeks, which are dry for most of the year in their lower reaches, but prone to occasional flooding during the winter and spring. There are five main creeks that join it from the southern side as it crosses the Adelaide Plains east of Adelaide, and at least five more in its path through the Adelaide Hills.

The plains tributaries, known as First to Fifth Creeks, lie to the east of the city, with First being the most southerly and the rest numbered consecutively northward. They were once named Greenhill, Hallett, Todd, Anstey and Ormsby rivulets respectively, and had Kaurna names before European settlement.

First, Second and Third Creeks have been particularly heavily modified. Some sections have been converted to concrete channels; others run through landscaped private gardens and some run in underground pipes. Much of the original vegetation has disappeared from the creeks, particularly those closest to the city. Introduced species including olives, bamboo, boxthorn, watsonia and blackberries have displaced native flora. There is some risk of flooding from all of these eastern suburbs creeks, as shown by the Floodplain Study, which includes plans and maps drawn up by the City of Burnside and neighbouring councils.

First Creek begins in Cleland Wildlife Park on the western side of Mount Lofty and Crafers, flows north-west through the south-eastern suburbs, past a drop at the Waterfall Gully falls, through Hazelwood and Tusmore Parks, and Marryatville High School, before discharging into the Torrens near Adelaide Zoo. Much of its course through the suburbs has been canalised, some underground. About 7.5% of its flow is diverted as it flows through the Adelaide Botanic Garden to create the First Creek Wetland, a scheme set up to ensure water security and to encourage diversity of flora and fauna in the area, thus helping to maintain health urban environments. Botanic Creek runs through the eastern Adelaide parklands from south to north, into the Adelaide Botanic Garden before joining First Creek.

Second Creek arises in the Summertown area of the Adelaide Hills, north of First Creek, and flows through Greenhill, through Slape Gully, entering the more populated suburbs as it flows through the Michael Perry Reserve in Stonyfell and onwards through the eastern suburbs of Erindale, Marryatville, Kensington (open at Borthwick Park) and Norwood, much of it canalised underground as far as St Peters. The St Peters section is an open canal shortly before it joins the Torrens. It was once called Hallet's Rivulet. Stonyfell Creek, arising on the eastern boundary of Stonyfell, flows through Kensington Gardens, including an open stretch in the Reserve before again being piped underground under West Terrace, passing under Kensington Park and Beulah Park. It joins Second Creek near the junction of Magill and Portrush Roads.

Third Creek arises near Norton Summit and flows through the suburbs of Magill, Tranmere, Trinity Gardens and Payneham, much of the way underground, before discharging into the Torrens at Felixstow.

Fourth Creek, or Morialta Creek, arises on the other side of Norton Summit, with various tributaries flowing into it from Marble Hill and Lobethal. It is most well known for its falls in Morialta Conservation Park. "Moriatta", a Kaurna word meaning "ever flowing", is now the official name of Fourth Creek. This name has been adapted to Morialta, which is now the name of an electoral district, school and the park through which the creek flows.

Fifth Creek arises within the Morialta Conservation Park, runs alongside Montacute Road for some way and discharges into the Torrens at Athelstone.

The largest catchment of the Torrens is Sixth Creek in the Adelaide Hills, which joins the Torrens at Castambul on Gorge Road.

Water flow

At the time of European settlement the river was a summertime chain of waterholes bounded by large gum trees. Flowing through the area where the city of Adelaide is sited the river was sometimes invisible beneath its gravel stream bed. It frequently flooded in winter and did not reach the sea, instead ending at coastal dunes where its waters created a vast but shallow freshwater wetlands. These wetlands, known as The Reedbeds after the dominant vegetation, occupied a large area of the western Adelaide Plains and were also fed by other waterways.

The river only flowed to the sea through the Port River, Barker Inlet, and Patawalonga River following heavy rain.

The upper reaches are used to create a potable water supply for metropolitan Adelaide with the river supplying three of Adelaide's eight reservoirs. The Torrens has a very variable flow leaving early settlers to use trial and error in determining bridge heights, with many bridges consequently being washed away. Due to the variability of Adelaide's climate, flow rates can change from a trickle to flood conditions quickly.

Since settlement it has repeatedly flooded, sometimes with disastrous consequences. Adelaide's western suburbs were especially prone to flooding due to their location on the river's alluvial fan. As development of Adelaide progressed the amount of rainfall required for flooding decreased and consequent damage increased. Increased stormwater runoff, modification of the river's banks and other changes all served to exacerbate the problem. Work done by various groups to minimise flooding was often counter productive with the creation of levees, moving and widening channels and other works simply shifting the flooding elsewhere.

Two early floods were, 18 September 1841 which resulted in two people drowning while trying to cross the river at Klemzig, and 22 September 1844, the largest recorded since settlement began, when "Shands' Brewery" was washed away after the river undermined its foundations. The river flooded market gardens and farms throughout its hills course causing extensive damage. Norwood was inundated to The Parade, Adelaide to Pirie and Rundle Streets, and many areas west of the city were left in a shallow lake. The Underdale (or Holbrooks) Bridge was destroyed, the Torrens Lake weir's bridge damaged, and the Felixstow Bridge over the Fourth Creek washed away.

European exploration and naming

The first European sighting of the river was in November 1836 by an exploration party comprising Lieutenant W.G. Field, John Morphett and George Strickland Kingston. The river was named "The Yatala" by the party but later renamed by Surveyor General Colonel William Light after Robert Torrens, chairman of the South Australian Colonisation Commission. The first Europeans to explore the Torrens Gorge to the headwaters and sources of the river were Dr George Imlay and John Hill in January 1838.

In recent years the river has been dually known by the indigenous Kaurna people's name of Karra wirra-parri (meaning river of the Red Gum forest), referring to the dense eucalyptus forest that lined its banks prior to clearing by early settlers. This name, alternatively Karra-weera, only referred to the lake section of the river, between Adelaide and North Adelaide. It was known as Karrundo-ingga at Hindmarsh, Witoingga near the reed beds, and Yertala everywhere when in flood, which has survived as Yatala in the naming of various places in Adelaide.

Pirltawardli, now within Park 1/Pitawardli, a location next to the river near the weir, on the western side of North Adelaide, is an area of great historical significance, as the location of a Kaurna camp and later the first Christian mission and school in South Australia. The missionaries documented the Kaurna language, which formed the basis of the 21st-century language revival of the language. The "native location" and school moved from the southern side of the river (now Bonython Park) to the northern side several times.

Changes after 1836

During early years of colonisation, the surrounding trees were cut down and the river's gravel used in road making and construction of buildings. As the natural environment was removed, the banks were eroded and the riverbed gradually levelled as waterholes filled. By 1878 the river was noted to be a malodorous, black sewer rather than the sylvan stream of the 1830s.

Much of the river's catchment area consists of cleared farmland with run-off captured in private dams to sustain farming over Adelaide's dry summer. Combined with the river's use for potable water this has greatly reduced the overall flow especially in the lower river.

Flood mitigation
A flood mitigation bill was passed in 1917 to not only combat the damage caused by floods but also the public health risk due to the lack of mains sewerage in the western suburbs. Popular opinion favoured diverting the flood waters into their "natural" outlets of the Port and Patawalonga Rivers. The chief engineer of the department of works favoured a cutting through sand dunes near Henley Beach, allowing the river an outlet, mitigating floods and preventing silting of the Port River. He also advocated the construction of a reservoir where the Kangaroo Creek Reservoir is now, to both mitigate floods and provide summer irrigation water for market gardens. Unfortunately the bill lapsed with no action as the government and local councils were unwilling to fund the works. The Millbrook Reservoir opened in 1918 as a summer water source, and flood mitigator if required. A bill was passed in 1923 to enact the earlier plan of cutting through the dunes and adding an upstream regulating weir. Again the bill lapsed due to a lack of commitment from parties on payment.

A major flood in 1931 and another in 1933 led to the latest in a series of government enquiries. The work was partly financed by a Commonwealth Government grant with the State Government arranging for the balance. The State Government, western and eastern local councils and the Municipal Tramways Trust shared interest costs. The scheme was enacted in 1935 with the construction of the Breakout Creek (also sometimes Breakout Channel) to take the Torrens westwards to the sea, completed in 1937. The scheme involved diversion of the river at Lockleys (near Adelaide Airport), with the original channel blocked and a new channel created to the sea. The reedbeds and swamps were subsequently drained and some of their area is now the site for the suburb of West Lakes.

It remains the only reservoir damming the river rather than being fed from weirs. The "River Torrens Committee" was formed in 1964 to advise the minister of works on preserving and enhancing the river's natural beauty, and developing it for recreational uses. The "River Torrens Acquisition Act 1970–72" was passed, authorising the purchase of land, in some cases  back from the top of the river's banks.

By 1980, further development along the riverbanks and removal of levées had reduced the outlet's capacity to a 1-in-35-year flood. A study showed that a 1-in-200-year flood would inundate 13,000 properties; so the Kangaroo Creek dam's level was raised, its spillway modified, the Breakout Creek channel capacity increased and some bridges reinforced. A development plan was approved in 1981 to purchase land along the length of the river, create a flood mitigating linear park and also to modify the Kangaroo Creek dam further. When the O-Bahn Busway was opened, the bridges were designed to cope with this scale of flood, although the two bridges in St Peters would likely be awash.

Torrens Lake

The  Torrens Lake was created in 1881 with the construction of a weir, landscaping of Elder Park and modification of the river's bank and surrounds into an English formal park. The lake forms a centrepiece of many Adelaide events and postcard scenes. Elder Park with its iron rotunda was opened on 28 November 1882. The Rotunda is a largely Glasgow built  iron bandstand which was funded by Sir Thomas Elder Smith, the park being named after him.

In 1867, prison labour from nearby Adelaide Gaol was used to build a wooden dam near the site of the current weir. The dam was poorly constructed and almost immediately the Torrens washed it away. Construction of a permanent concrete weir was begun in November 1880 and completed, at a cost of £7,000, in 1881. The sluice gates were closed to begin filling the  Torrens Lake on 1 July 1881. At the lake's official opening on 21 July 1881 an estimated 40,000, almost the entire population of Adelaide, attended. During the 1889 flood, the weir was overwhelmed, its gates jammed, and in trying to free them the weir's designer John Langdon was crippled. The weir was rebuilt from 1928 to 1929 with its footbridge relocated and the centre section replaced. The gates can now be fully raised and the river allowed to flow unimpeded.

The "Popeye" boats are privately owned recreational ferries that operate on the lake between Elder Park and the Adelaide Zoo. The first boat was launched on the Torrens Lake by Gordon Watts in 1935. It was a  boat, built on the banks of the Torrens to hold up to 20 passengers and named Popeye 1. Watts purchased a former Glenelg cruise boat in 1948 and placed it in service as Popeye 2. Over the next two years three new jarrah hulled boats were built at Port Adelaide; carrying 40 passengers each they were numbered Popeye 3 through Popeye 5. Trips on the Popeyes from Elder Park to the zoo became a treasured family outing and the boats hosted weddings and other events. In March 1962 Keith Altman, owner of riverside eatery "Jolley's Boathouse", took over the Popeyes and introduced recreational paddle boats to the river. The Popeyes had a brush with royalty in March 1977 with Popeye 5 ferrying Queen Elizabeth II and Prince Philip followed by a choir in Popeye 4. Prime Minister Malcolm Fraser officially launched three new fibreglass models named Popeyes I, II and III in 1982 as the wooden boats' replacements.

Water use
In the early days of Adelaide, the Torrens was used for bathing, stock watering, rubbish disposal, water supply and as a de facto sewer and drainage sump. This led to a range of health issues until finally, in 1839, when a dysentery outbreak killed five children in one day, Governor Gawler forbid bathing, clothes washing and the disposal of animal carcases in the Torrens within  of town. The quality of the river's water was not helped by water supply methods. Carters used to drive water carts into the Torrens to refill. To prevent this the State Government built a facility with steam powered pumps and water storage in 1852, from which the carters then filled.

The "Waterworks Act" of 1856 was passed to enable damming of the upstream Torrens for water supply purposes. The resulting "Water Commission" arranged the following year for foundations to be laid for a water supply weir  from Adelaide near Campbelltown. Unsuitable geology and shoddy work by contractors Frost & Watson led to it being washed away in July 1858 and the site abandoned. Engineer Hamilton was replaced by John England. Government then created a Waterworks Department, which started construction of a weir  from the city and reservoir at Thorndon Park in 1859. The weir was completed on 4 June 1860 and the reservoir began supplying piped water in December. Engineer England was found by a Select Committee to have overpaid the contractors and forced to resign. The water was captured at the weir, piped for storage to the Thorndon Park Reservoir then to a water tower at Kent Town. Water from Kent Town storage was distributed via a manually controlled water system, unmetered for its first six years. Within six years 20,000 citizens in Adelaide and Port Adelaide were connected to reticulated water from the Torrens. By 1872, the  Hope Valley Reservoir in the foothills of the Adelaide Hills was completed as a storage reservoir, supplied via an aqueduct and tunnel.

Public baths were built in 1861 just north of the current Parliament House. They were supplied with reticulated water from the Torrens and progressively upgraded with the last change a 1940 remodelling including an Olympic-size swimming pool and diving tower. The baths were demolished in 1970 to make way for the Adelaide Festival Centre. The  Millbrook Reservoir was constructed high in the Adelaide Hills from 1913 to 1918 submerging the town of Millbrook. An earth bank dam fed by mile long tunnel from a weir on the river at Gumeracha, its elevation allows gravity supply of water to Adelaide's eastern suburbs.

Bridges
Due to the river's path through the centre of Adelaide, transport necessitated the construction of many bridges. Prior to the bridges all crossings had been via fords which proved a dangerous practice in winter and spring. In 1849 £6,000 was allocated to bridge the Torrens. Within four years three wooden bridges had been built and subsequently destroyed in floods. The bridges listed below are from up-river to down-river.

Flora and fauna
The river was formerly a food source with yabbies, mussels and small fish, however the reduction in water quality, changing of the river's habitat, and introduction of European fish species has led to a reduction in fauna quantity and diversity. Exotic pest species such as the European carp, redfin perch and trout have greatly reduced native fish populations like the big headed gudgeon (Philypnodon grandiceps) but native waterfowl are common along the river with Pacific black ducks, Australian wood ducks, black swans, ibis, egrets and herons amongst the more than 100 species seen. The number of exotic waterfowl species such as mallards has reduced in recent years. In places the steep banks of the river are an ideal habitat for long-necked tortoises.

The river, and its tributaries, had a population of water rats (Hydromys chrysogaster) and Australian swamp rats (Rattus lutreolus). Water rats remain in reduced numbers, but the introduced black rat (Rattus rattus) and brown rat (Rattus norvegicus) have largely supplanted the natives. The house mouse (Mus musculus) is now the most common mammal of the Torrens environ.

Widely found native reeds, sedges and rushes along the upper river are bulrush, knobby club rush, spike rush, common reed, sea rush and pale rush. River red gum (Eucalyptus camaldulensis) and blue gum (Eucalyptus leucoxylon) trees are found along the riverbanks, although sparser than the forest that was seen by European discoverers. Still present are many of the original vegetation species like: Sheoak (Casuarina stricta), native cherry (Exocarpos cupressiformis), native pine (Callitris preissii) and Australia's floral emblem the golden wattle (Acacia pycnantha)

Today's river

From its source the river flows westwards through Birdwood and Gumeracha. It then continues down through Torrens Gorge entering suburban Adelaide at Athelstone with some of its path paralleled by the O-Bahn Busway. It passes between the city-centre and North Adelaide, forming the Torrens Lake between the Adelaide Zoo and a weir opposite Adelaide Gaol. The river then continues the remaining eight kilometres to the sea at Henley Beach South, emptying into Gulf St Vincent via a constructed outlet.

Hope Valley, Millbrook and Kangaroo Creek Reservoirs, which provide water storage for Adelaide, capture the river's flow. These reservoirs form part of the Adelaide Hills catchment, which supplies 60% of Adelaide's water needs in an average year. Adelaide City Council uses water from the lower river to irrigate the city's surrounding parklands. Rubbish accumulation in the lower river is controlled with numerous collection racks, and sediments and other pollutants are filtered through constructed wetlands.

The earliest linear river park in Australia bounds the suburban end of the river. The park is 35 km long with numerous playgrounds walkways and bicycle tracks. On the south bank of the lake, adjacent to the Adelaide Festival Centre, Elder Park is used for the annual Tasting Australia festival, mass singing of christmas carols at the annual "Carols by Candlelight", and other public events throughout the year. The Popeye tourist boats, small paddle boats and Black Swans of the lake are icons of the area and frequently featured in postcard photographs of the city. Due to now-limited natural river flow and stormwater born organic material, the lower river, (particularly the lake), is often polluted with algal blooms and significant levels of E. coli bacteria in spring and summer. Numerous taskforces have been formed to improve the river's water quality, including one created in 2006 by the Minister for the Environment and Conservation.

The river is a used by many for recreation, with the footpaths on the riverbanks often filled with cyclists and joggers. Rowers use the lake for training all year round, and many clubs such as the Adelaide University Boat Club, the Adelaide Rowing Club, and the boat houses of the secondary schools which participate in the annual Head of the River are located upon its banks. Several rowing regattas are held on the Torrens Lake course in the summer months of each year, contested by both club and school crews.

See also

References

Bibliography

Further reading

Adelaide & Mount Lofty Ranges Natural Resources Management Board
State Library Manning Index: River Torrens
 (CC Attribution-NonCommercial 3.0 Australia Licence)
 – includes some history old photos and citations

Physiographic sections
Torrens
Adelaide Plains